Sault (frequently stylised as SAULT) are a British music collective that make a mixture of R&B, house and disco. The project is helmed by producer Inflo, best known for his work with Little Simz, Michael Kiwanuka, Cleo Sol, Jungle and Adele. Despite critical acclaim, Sault eschew interaction with the media and feature an array of unnamed collaborators. They have never played a live show, given an interview or released a music video in support of their music. They frequently foreground Black-centric issues.

Since their emergence in 2019, the collective has released eleven studio albums, with 5 (2019), 7 (2019), Untitled (Black Is) (2020), Untitled (Rise) (2020), and Nine (2021),  being released between 2019 and 2021. After releasing the orchestral instrumental album, AIR, in April 2022, the collective surprise-released five studio albums simultaneously on their website on 1 November that same year.

History

2019: 5 and 7
On 15 February 2019, Sault released their debut track "We Are the Sun" via their record label Forever Living Originals; this was followed up by the collective on 15 March 2019 with "Don't Waste My Time".

On 5 May of the same year, Sault released their debut album titled 5. The album cover art is a black background with matchsticks used to denote the number five. This design with the matchsticks and black background can be seen in all of their numerically titled releases, except for 11.

Sault returned with their second album four months later called 7 on 27 September, which like 5, was again met with widespread acclaim.

2020–2021: Untitled albums, Mercury Prize nomination and Nine
Sault's albums in 2020, Untitled (Black Is), released in June, and Untitled (Rise), released in September, both received universal critical acclaim, including a nomination for the Mercury Prize in 2021 for the latter.

On 25 June 2021, the band released their fifth studio album, Nine, which was available for 99 days from its release until 2 October 2021. In the same year, the band were nominated at the MOBO Awards for Best R&B/Soul Act alongside vocalist and eventual winner Cleo Sol.

2022–present: Air, 10 and five surprise albums
On 13 April 2022 Sault released their sixth studio album, Air. The Guardian described it as a "total volte-face" and Pitchfork described it as "a sharp pivot to lush contemporary classical". In October that same year, the collective released a reggae-influenced EP, 10 (styled X), consisting of one ten-minute-long song called "Angel".

On 11 November 2022, the collective surprise-released five albums simultaneously as a free download via WeTransfer, writing: "Here are 5 albums released as an offering to God. Available for free download for five days. The password to unlock all 5 albums is in the message. Love SAULT X." The five individual albums—11, AIIR, Earth, Today & Tomorrow, and Untitled (God)—feature 56 tracks in total. According to Variety, "It's possible that this is the largest amount of newly recorded music released by a relatively major artist at once."

Members
The line-up of Sault remains a mystery, with unconfirmed members cited as below.

Inflo – producer, various instruments
Cleo Sol – lead vocals
Kid Sister – lead vocals
Kadeem Clarke

Discography

Studio albums

Extended plays

Singles

Notes

Awards and nominations

References

External links

Pass the Sault by Elías Villoro for BoingBoing (2022-12-01)

British contemporary R&B musical groups
British house music groups
Black British musical groups
Musical groups established in 2019
2019 establishments in England
Musical groups from London